Roberto Feliberti Cintrón (born April 7, 1963) is a Puerto Rican jurist and Associate Justice of the Supreme Court of Puerto Rico.

Early years and education 

Feliberti Cintrón was born in San Juan, Puerto Rico. He was the second of four children born to Emiliano Feliberti Martínez and Hilda Cintrón Brandes. Thanks to a U.S. Navy scholarship, he was able to attend Purdue University, where he earned a Bachelor of Science in Mathematics. During his time in the Navy attended the Naval Justice School. He later graduated from the University of Puerto Rico School of Law in 1991.

Professional experience 

After graduating from Purdue, he was commissioned in the United States Navy. After attending the Naval Justice School he served as a Legal Officer at the Roosevelt Roads Naval Station in Ceiba, Puerto Rico, where he remained for four years of service from 1986 to 1989. After law school, Feliberti Cintrón began his legal career as a law clerk for the United States District Court for the District of Puerto Rico. Later, he worked at a private firm in Puerto Rico, specializing in commercial litigation, where he remained for 16 years and eventually became a partner.

Judicial career

Court of appeals 

On December 1, 2009, Feliberti Cintrón took a seat on the Puerto Rico Court of Appeals after being nominated by Governor Luis Fortuño.

Appointment to Supreme Court 

Gov. Fortuño nominated Feliberti Cintrón to a newly created seat on the Supreme Court of Puerto Rico on May 9, 2011. He was sworn in on May 25, 2011 with fellow Associate Justice Luis Estrella Martínez.

Personal life

Feliberti Cintron has one daughter, Hazel, and three siblings, Emiliano, Vanessa, and Geraldine. He enjoys sports, especially American football, and he is a fan of the New Orleans Saints. He also enjoys attending mass, reading, movies, and spending time with his family.

References

External links
 Biography of Roberto Filiberti Cintrón

1963 births
Living people
Associate Justices of the Supreme Court of Puerto Rico
Purdue University alumni
Puerto Rican judges
Puerto Rican United States Navy personnel
United States Navy officers
University of Puerto Rico alumni